The 1996 All-Ireland Junior Hurling Championship was the 75th staging of the All-Ireland Junior Championship since its establishment by the Gaelic Athletic Association in 1912. The championship began on 26 May 1996 and ended on 14 September 1996.

Kilkenny entered the championship as the defending champions

The All-Ireland final was played on 14 September 1996 at O'Connor Park in Tullamore, between Galway and Kilkenny, in what was their first meeting in the final in 12 years. Galway won the match by 1-14 to 2-09 to claim their second championship title overall and a first title since 1939.

Cork's Jimmy Smiddy was the championship's top scorer with 4-15.

Results

Leinster Junior Hurling Championship

Leinster quarter-final

Leinster semi-finals

Leinster final

Munster Junior Hurling Championship

Munster first round

Munster semi-finals

Munster final

All-Ireland Junior Hurling Championship

All-Ireland semi-finals

All-Ireland final

Championship statistics

Top scorers

Top scorers overall

Top scorers in a single game

References

Junior
All-Ireland Junior Hurling Championship